The People's Representative Council of the Republic of Indonesia (DPR-RI), also known as the House of Representatives, is one of two elected chambers of the People's Consultative Assembly (MPR), the national legislature of Indonesia. It is considered the lower house, while the Regional Representative Council (DPD) serve as the upper house; while the Indonesian constitution does not explicitly mention the divide, the DPR enjoys more power, privilege, and prestige compared to the DPD.

Members of the DPR are elected through a general election every five years. Currently, there are 575 members; an increase compared to 560 prior to the 2019 elections.

The DPR has been the subject of frequent public criticism due to perceived high levels of fraud and corruption.

History

Volksraad

In 1915, members of the Indonesian nationalist organisation Budi Utomo and others toured the Netherlands to argue for the establishment of a legislature for the Dutch East Indies, and in December 1916 a bill was passed to establish a Volksraad (People's Council). It met for the first time in 1918. Ten of its nineteen members elected by local councils were Indonesians, as were five of the nineteen appointed members.  However, it had only advisory powers, although the governor-general had to consult it on financial matters. The body grew in size to 60 members, half of who were elected by a total of 2,228 people.

In 1925, the Volksraad gained some legislative powers. It had to agree to the budget and internal legislation, and could sponsor laws of its own. However, it had no power to remove the governor general and remained nothing more than a gesture.

In 1940, after the German invasion of the Netherlands, and the fleeing of the Dutch government to exile in London, there was a motion calling for an inquiry into turning it into a quasi-legislature, but this was withdrawn after a negative response from the government. In July 1941, the Volksraad passed a motion calling for the creation of a militia made up of up to 6,000 Indonesians. In February 1942, the Japanese invasion began, and in May 1942 the Dutch formally dissolved the Volksraad. It was replaced by a council made up of heads of departments.

Japanese occupation
The Japanese invaded Dutch East Indies in 1942. By 1943, the tide had turned against them, and to encourage support for the war effort, the Japanese appointed Indonesian advisors (sanyo) to the administration and appointed Sukarno leader of a new Central Advisory Board (Chuo Sangi-kai) in Jakarta. In March 1945, the Japanese established the Investigating Committee for Preparatory Work for Independence or BPUPK, chaired by Radjiman Wediodiningrat, with Sukarno, Hatta and Thamrin among its members.  This body drew up a constitution for an independent Indonesia over several weeks of meetings. At a session of the committee on 1 June 1945, Sukarno laid down the principles of Pancasila by which an Indonesia would be governed.

On 7 August, the day after the atomic bombing of Hiroshima, the Preparatory Committee for Indonesian Independence or PPKI was established. Sukarno was chairman, and Hatta vice-chairman. The two proclaimed the Independence of Indonesia on 17 August. On 18 August, the PPKI accepted the constitution drawn up by the BPUPK as the provisional Constitution of Indonesia and decided that during a six-month transition period, the new republic would be governed according to the constitution by a president, assisted by a National Committee, who would establish the two chamber legislature mandated by the constitution. The upper chamber, the People's Consultative Assembly would then have six months to draw up a new constitution, leaving open the possibility that this would be an entirely new document free of the influence of the situation prevailing during World War II.  The PPKI also named Sukarno as president and Hatta vice-president.

KNIP

The Central Indonesian National Committee or KNIP was a body appointed to assist the president of the newly independent Indonesia, Sukarno, on 29 August 1945. It was originally planned to have a purely advisory function, but on 18 October, Vice-president Hatta issued Edict No.X transferring the powers the Constitution conferred on the People's Consultative Assembly and People's Representative Council from the president to the KNIP. The day-to-day tasks of the KNIP would be carried out by a Working Committee.

During the War of Independence, the entire KNIP was unable to meet regularly. Therefore, the KNIP acted as the upper house, the People's Consultative Assembly in the constitution, meeting only infrequently to discuss fundamental and pressing national issues, while the Working Committee acted as the day-to-day parliament.

Federal legislature

In January 1948, the Dutch authorities established the Provisional Federal Council for Indonesia (Voorlopige Federale Raad voor Indonesia) comprising Lieutenant Governor Hubertus van Mook and eight Indonesians chosen by him to represent the views of Indonesia. Two months later, the council made up of heads of departments that the Dutch had set up to replace the pre-war Volksraad officially became the Provisional Federal Government (Voorlopige Federale Regering). This body invited heads of the states making up the United States of Indonesia to send delegates to the Federal Conference in Bandung in May 1948. That month, leaders of states and other areas joined to establish the Federal Consultative Assembly (Bijeenkomst voor Federaal Overleg or BFO) to represent the federal regions.

Following the transfer of sovereignty to the United States of Indonesia (RIS), in December 1949, the state adopted a bicameral system, with a 150-member People's Representative Council (DPR-RIS)and a Senate with two representatives from each of the 16 component areas of the RIS. Initially the People's Representative Council had 50 representatives from the Republic of Indonesia and 100 from the other 15 component parts of the RIS. The plan was for elections within a year. The KNIP met for the last time on 15 December 1949 to agree to the Republic of Indonesia joining the RIS.

This People's Representative Council met for the first time on 15 February 1950 at the former Sociëteit Concordia Building on Jalan Wahidin, Jakarta. Most of the sessions were held in this building, but it also met at other buildings, including the Hotel Des Indies. The DPR-RIS passed seven laws in its six months of existence, but was soon overtaken by events as the federal system collapsed as the individual states dissolved themselves into the unitary Republic of Indonesia.

Liberal democracy

Given that the Republic of Indonesia did not want the RIS parliament to become the legislature of the unitary republic, in May 1950, Hatta and representatives from the federal states agreed to establish a new parliament comprising the 150 members of the RIS parliament, 46 members of the KNIP Working Committee, 13 from the Republic of Indonesia Supreme Advisory council and 32 RIS senators, making 241 members. On 17 August 1950, the RIS was formally dissolved and the unitary Republic of Indonesia came into being.

The Provisional People's Representative Council met for the first time on 16 August 1950. By then there had been minor changes to the agreed composition as three RIS senators had refused to take their seats and 21 representatives from the State of Pasundan were replaced by 19 members appointed by the Republic. Of the 236 members, only 204 took their oaths of office on 20 August, and only 170 voted in the election of the speaker, which was narrowly won by Sartono of the Indonesian National Party (PNI). Masyumi was the largest parliamentary party with 49 seats. The PNI had 36 seats and no other party had more than 17.

In 1952, the DPR demanded a reorganisation of the Ministry of Defense and the dismissal of the Army leadership in response to military opposition to troop reductions. This led to the '17 October 1952' incident with large-scale demonstrations at the presidential palace by soldiers and civilians demanding the DPR be dissolved. The crowd dispersed after Sukarno addressed it.

Despite the election bill being introduced in 1951, it was not passed until 1953 and elections were held in 1955. The results surprised everybody. The Indonesian Socialist Party did worse than expected, as did Masyumi, while the Indonesian Communist party did better than predicted. Following the election, the PNI and Masyumi had 57 seats each, the Nahdlatul Ulama had 45 and the PKI 39. There were now 28 parties in parliament, compared with 20 before the election. Only 63 of the 257 pre-election members of parliament still had seats, but there were 15 women members compared with eight before. The new parliament met on 26 March 1956, forming the People's Representative Council (1956–1959).

Over the next few years, public dissatisfaction with the political parties grew. In 1957, Sukarno announced his concept of a national unity cabinet and a National Council made up of functional groups to advise the cabinet. This council was established in May 1957. On 5 July 1959, Sukarno issued a decree, which as well as reviving the provisional 1945 Constitution, dissolved parliament.

The new DPR took office on 22 July 1959. It accepted the president's decree by acclamation and said it was ready to work as stipulated by the 1945 Constitution. However, in March 1960 it unexpectedly rejected the government's budget. Sukarno then dissolved it as it was seen as no longer fulfilling the president's hopes that it would work with him in the spirit of the 1945 Constitution, Guided Democracy and the Political manifesto (Manipol, referring to Sukarno's 1959 Independence Day speech). The DPR session ended on 24 June.

Guided Democracy

Sukarno then used this difference of opinion with the legislature as justification for the establishment of a People's Representative Council of Mutual Assistance (DPR-GR). The membership was no longer based on the results of the 1955 election, but was determined by the president, who could appoint and dismiss members at will. Political opponents were sidelined, and some who opposed the establishment of the DPR-GR refused to take their seats. As Masyumi and the Indonesian Socialist Party did not agree with Sukarno, they were given no seats, meaning there was no longer a parliamentary opposition. A number of representatives from various functional groups including the military were also appointed. As of mid-1962, there were 281 members; 130 from 10 political parties, 150 from 20 functional groups and 1 representative from West Irian.

The responsibilities and duties of the parliament were dramatically curtailed as it was reduced to helping the government implement its policies. In 1960 it produced only 9 laws, compared with 87 in 1958 and 29 in 1959. It became little more than a rubber stamp for Sukarno's policies. For example, it passed a law allowing volunteers to be sent to participate in the 'Confrontation' with Malaysia.

New Order

Following the coup attempt of the 30 September Movement in 1965, which was officially blamed on the Indonesian Communist Party (PKI), the DPR-GR was purged of PKI members – 57 communist members were suspended. On 14 November parliament resumed without the PKI representatives, including deputy speaker M. H. Lukman. In 1969, the government passed an election law that set the membership of the DPR at 360 elected and 100 appointed members.  The number of representatives from the military increased to 75. Elections were finally held in 1971, having been delayed to allow preparations to ensure a victory for the government's Golkar organisation.

Following the election, the words Gotong Royong were removed and the body became the Dewan Perwakilan Rakyat again. In 1973 the remaining political parties were reduced to two, the United Development Party and the Indonesian Democratic Party. For the remainder of the New Order, Golkar won absolute majorities at every elections, while the parliament did not produce a single law on its own initiative, its role being reduced to passing laws proposed by the government.

Reform era

In May 1998, President Suharto stepped down, leading to Indonesia's first free elections since 1955 taking place the following year. Of the 500 seats, 462 were elected, while 38 seats were reserved for the military/police. In the 2004 elections, all 550 seats were elected. In the 2009 elections the number of seats was increased to 560. There are now no appointed military officers in the legislature.

Powers
As is common in countries with presidential system, the President does not hold the power to suspend or dissolve the DPR. On the other hand, the legislature does not have full control over the President or the government in whole.

The Three Functions
Under Article 20A of the amended 1945 Constitution, the DPR has three main functions: legislative, budgeting and oversight. The legislative function of the DPR consists of:

 Drafting the Program Legislasi Nasional or Prolegnas (lists of prioritized drafts and bills);
 Drafting and holding deliberations on the Rancangan Undang-Undang or the bills of law;
 Receiving the bills of law proposed by the DPD, especially on the subjects of regional autonomy; Central-Regional governance relations; creations, proliferations, and mergers of regional territories; management of regional resources; and Central-Regional fiscal balance;
 Holding deliberations on the bills of law proposed either by the President or by the DPD; 
 Jointly passing the bills of law into Law with the President;
 Passing or rejecting the Peraturan Pemerintah Pengganti Undang-Undang (Perppu) or Government Regulation in-lieu-of Law enacted by the President. If passed, the Perppu is enshrined as Law.

The budgeting function of the DPR consists of:

 Approving and passing into Law the Anggaran Pendapatan dan Belanja Negara (APBN) or National Budget proposed by the President;
 Taking into considerations the opinions of the DPD, especially on the subjects of taxes, education, and religious affairs;
 Following up the state financial accountability reports made by the Badan Pemeriksa Keuangan (BPK) or National Board of Audit;
 Approving the transfers of any state assets and properties which are considered impactful on the people and the national finance.

The oversight function of the DPR consists of:

 Overseeing the execution of the Laws, National Budget, and government policies;
 Holding deliberations and following up on the oversights exercised by the DPD, especially on the subjects of regional autonomy; Central-Regional governance relations; creations, proliferations, and mergers of regional territories; management of regional resources; Central-Regional fiscal balance; execution of the National Budget; and on the subjects of taxes, education, and religious affairs.

The Rights 
The 1945 Constitution guarantees several rights of the DPR. Especially in regard to the oversight function, they include the right to question the government regarding any government policy considered important, strategic, and impactful (Hak Interpelasi); the right to investigate allegations of breach of the Laws by government policy (Hak Angket); and the right to express opinions (Hak Menyatakan Pendapat) on any government policy, on extraordinary domestic or foreign events, on the follow up of the exercise of the rights to question and to investigate government policy, as well as on the initial impeachment process of the President and/or the Vice President.

The MPs themselves are vested with rights in order to execute their duties. They include:

 Right to propose drafts and bills of Laws;
 Right to question the government and its officials;
 Right to express opinions and offer suggestions;
 Right to elect and be elected into parliamentary duties;
 Right to defend oneself on alleged violations of parliamentary code of ethics;
 Right of immunity from prosecution due to any statements, questions, and opinions made for the purpose of parliamentary duties, except in violation of parliamentary code of ethics and code of conducts; 
 Right to be assigned certain stately protocols;
 Right to financial and administrative benefits;
 Right to oversee the execution of the National Budget, as well as the interests of the people and their constituency;
 Right to propose and promote programs for the benefit of their constituency;
 Right to promote and inform the creation of a new Law.

Current composition
The People's Representative Council has 575 members resulting from the 2019 legislative election. The representatives come from 9 political parties.

Structure

Leadership 

The DPR leadership consist of a Speaker and four Deputy Speakers. The most recent Speaker's election was conducted under provisions of Law No. 13/2019 (Amendment) of the Law No. 17/2014 on the MPR, DPR, DPRD, and DPRD; popularly known as UU MD3. The Speaker's seat is reserved to the political party with largest number of representation in the chamber, and the four Deputy Speakership are reserved to the second, third, fourth, and fifth largest political parties respectively.

 Speaker: Puan Maharani (PDI-P/Central Java V)
 First Deputy Speaker: Lodewijk Freidrich Paulus (Golkar/Lampung I)
 Second Deputy Speaker: Sufmi Dasco Ahmad (Gerindra/Banten III)
 Third Deputy Speaker: Rachmad Gobel (Nasdem/Gorontalo)
 Fourth Deputy Speaker: Muhaimin Iskandar (PKB/East Java VIII)

Each Deputy Speakers oversee the operation of the following Council organs:
 First Deputy Speaker is responsible for politics and national security, overseeing the First Commission, Second Commission, Third Commission, Committee for Inter-Parliamentary Cooperation, and Legislation Committee. 
 Second Deputy Speaker is responsible for finance and economics, overseeing the Eleventh Commission, Budget Committee, and Public Finance Accountability Committee. 
 Third Deputy Speaker is responsible for industries and public development, overseeing the Fourth Commission, Fifth Commission, Sixth Commission, and Seventh Commission. 
 Fourth Deputy Speaker is responsible for public welfare, overseeing the Eighth Commission, Ninth Commission, Committee of the Household, and Committee for Ethics.

Commissions 
Most, but not all, of the Council business are conducted through the commissions, akin to the standing committee of the United States Congress. Currently, there are eleven commissions.

 First Commission: defense, foreign affairs, information, communications, and intelligence.
 Chair: Meutya Hafid (Golkar)
 Second Commission: home affairs, local autonomy, public service, bureaucratic reform, elections, land affairs, and agrarian reform.
 Chair: Ahmad Doli Kurnia Tandjung (Golkar)
 Third Commission: law, human rights, and national security.
 Chair: Bambang Wuryanto (PDI-P)
 Fourth Commission: agriculture, environmental affairs, forestry, and maritime affairs.
 Chair: Sudin (PDI-P)
 Fifth Commission: infrastructure, transportation, disadvantaged areas and transmigration, meteorology, climatology, geophysics, and search and rescue.
 Chair: Lasarus (PDI-P)
 Sixth Commission: industry, trade, SMEs, cooperatives, SOEs, investment, and standards.
 Chair: Faisol Riza (PKB)
 Seventh Commission: energy, research, and technology.
 Chair: Bambang Hariyadi (Gerindra)
 Eighth Commission: religious affairs, social affairs, disaster management, women's empowerment, and child protection.
 Chair: Ashabul Kahfi (PAN)
 Ninth Commission: health, labor, and the demography.
 Chair: Felly Estelita Runtuwene (Nasdem)
 Tenth Commission: education, sports, tourism, and creative economy.
 Chair: Syaiful Huda (PKB)
 Eleventh Commission: finance, national development planning, and banking.
 Chair: Dolfie (PDI-P)

Other organs 
 Steering Committee, responsible to set up legislative agenda for session year and/or period.
 Legislation Committee, responsible for drafting bills and preparing the National Legislative Program (Prolegnas).
 Budget Committee, responsible for drafting the national budget.
 Committee of the Household, responsible for internal affairs of the council and overseeing the Secretariat-General.
 Committee for Inter-Parliamentary Cooperation, responsible for conducting external relations of the council.
 Ethics Committee, responsible for investigating Council members who violate the ethics policy and code of conduct.

The Opposition 
The Opposition is a term used to describe political parties which are represented in the DPR, but not in the cabinet, and thus organized themselves as an opposition faction. However it is not a formal term and they considered themselves a 'critical partner of the government'.

During the 2019 Election, the incumbent president Joko Widodo ('Jokowi') led a majority coalition of ten parties which already supported him during the previous 2014 Election. Opposing him is Prabowo Subianto, who led a minority coalition of five parties. Eventually after the election, the Jokowi Administration invited Gerindra and PAN into the governing coalition, appointing Subianto as Defence Minister.

Under the current Jokowi Administration, Prosperous Justice Party and Democratic Party are the only two parties in the DPR which have no representation in the cabinet. After Subianto's Gerindra as well as PAN joined the government, the Opposition coalition effectively went into dormancy, and no talks of forming new coalition exist between the remaining two parties.

Buildings of the Legislature 
Throughout its history, the legislature has convened in multiple buildings.

Volksraad 
The Volksraad convened in the Volksraadgebouw (Building of the Volksraad) since 1918 until 1942 during Japanese occupation when it was dissolved. Today the building is known as Gedung Pancasila, located within the Foreign Ministry complex, and is still used for hosting important state events.

Central Indonesian National Committee (KNIP) 
In August 1945, the KNIP was established to assist the President in the early days of Indonesian independence. Soon after, KNIP was granted legislative powers and would function as a legislature until a democratically elected national legislature can be formed. Meanwhile, the presidential system was replaced by parliamentary system, and Sutan Syahrir was appointed as the first prime minister of Indonesia. Due to the unstable situation during those days, the KNIP was unable to convene in single, permanent place.

The first meeting of the KNIP following its inauguration was held on 29 August in Schouwburg Weltevreden, today known as Gedung Kesenian Jakarta (Jakarta Art Building). Due to lack of available working space, the secretariat was run from the defunct Jawa Hokokai headquarters close to Lapangan Banteng. Meanwhile, second meeting of the KNIP was held on 16 and 17 October in old Binnenhof Hotel in Kramat Raya street, Jakarta. The secretariat was also moved, this time to a building in Cilacap street, now occupied by the Education Ministry. Third meeting of the KNIP was held in a building in Prince Diponegoro street, now known as PSKD 1 Senior High School, situated right across the Centraal Burgerlijke Ziekenhuis (which now constitutes part of the Cipto Mangunkusumo Central Hospital).

Fourth meeting of the KNIP was held not in Jakarta, but in Surakarta in Central Java. It was held in Gedung Republik Indonesia, from 28 February until 3 March. The Working Committee (the permanent standing committee of the KNIP) and the secretariat later moved to Hotel van Laar in Purworejo, provided by the regent of Purworejo. Fifth meeting of the KNIP was held on 25 February until 3 March 1946 in Societeit Concordia Building in Malang, East Java. Following the fifth meeting, the Working Committee and the secretariat again moved to Yogyakarta, temporarily occupying an Indonesian Red Cross building, before later moved to Loge Theosofie Building in Malioboro, occupying it until 1950. Few years later, the sixth meeting of the KNIP was held on 6th until 15 December 1949 in Sitihinggil Keraton (part of the Yogyakarta Kraton).

Federal Parliament 

Following the agreement reached during the 1949 Round Table Conference, a federal constitution was drafted for Indonesia, and thus KNIP was dissolved and replaced by the DPR-RIS. The Parliament was now able to settle down, although the venues might move. Established along with it was the Federal Senate, which served as an upper house, separate from the DPR-RIS. This parliament was inaugurated on 16 February 1950 in Societeit Concordia Building in Jakarta, now located within the Finance Ministry complex (not to be confused with Societeit Concordia Building in Bandung, now known as Gedung Merdeka). Following the inauguration, meetings were held instead in the upper floor of Hotel Des Indes. The hotel was later demolished in 1971 and replaced by Duta Merlin Shopping Center on its site.

"Liberal Democracy" Parliament 

After the federal system collapsed and Indonesia returned to its unitary form in 1950, a provisional constitution established a provisional parliament (Dewan Perwakilan Rakyat Sementara/DPRS), as well as a constitutional assembly (Konstituante) for drafting a new, permanent constitution for Indonesia. The DPRS convened in Jakarta, while the Konstituante convened in Societeit Concordia Building in Bandung.

The DPRS was finally replaced by a proper DPR after September 1955 election was held, followed shortly with the December 1955 election for electing members of the Konstituante.

"Guided Democracy" Parliament 
Following years of political instability, as well as the Konstituante's failure to draft a new constitution, in 1959 President Sukarno assumed executive powers and ordered to return to the 1945 Constitution, dismantling the parliamentary system of governance that had run since KNIP was granted legislative powers in 1945. Through executive orders and decisions, the provisional People's Consultative Assembly (Majelis Permusyawaratan Rakyat Sementara/MPRS), the national legislature of Indonesia as prescribed by the 1945 Constitution, was finally established alongside various other constitutional bodies.

The DPR based on 1955 election was later dissolved in 1960, and replaced with DPR-GR (GR stands for Gotong Royong), whose members were appointed by the President. The DPR-GR first used the Societeit Concordia Building in Jakarta to convene and then moved to Gedung Dewan Perwakilan Rakyat near Lapangan Banteng, while the MPRS convened in Gedung Merdeka in Bandung. Because most members of the MPRS were residents of Jakarta, a branch secretariat of the MPRS was established in Jakarta and occupied Stannia Building on Cik Ditiro street.

In 1964 DPR-GR moved to convene in a temporary building within Senayan Sport Complex while the DPR Building went under renovation. This temporary building previously served as the headquarter for 1962 Asian Games construction and development office (Komando Urusan Pembangunan Asian Games/KUPAG). Events following the September 30th Movement in 1965, however, moved the renovation process to a halt. The DPR-GR was forced to use the basketball court building previously used in 1964 Asian Games. The 1966 MPRS General Session and 1967 MPRS Special Session was held in the Gedung Istana Olah Raga (Istora).

"New Order" Parliament 
After the 1962 Asian Games, President Sukarno ordered the construction of a building complex next to Senayan Sport Complex, to be used as a political venues for a "Conference of the New Emerging Forces" (CONEFO) to rival the United Nations, and international games to be held next door as GANEFO to rival the Olympics. The chief architect for this project was Soejoedi Wirjoatmodjo, a graduate of Technical University of Berlin and head of the Department of Architecture in Bandung Institute of Technology.

The constructions was halted following President Sukarno's fall from power, and the project later resumed under Soeharto presidency, when it was officially promulgated with Ampera Cabinet Presidium Decision No. 79/U/Kep/11/1966, dated 9 November 1966 that the old CONEFO political venues project were to be repurposed for the national legislature.

The construction proceeded gradually; Main Conference Building completed in March 1968, Secretariat Building in March 1978, Auditorium Building in September 1982, and Banquet Building in February 1983.

The MPR/DPR Complex in Senayan, Jakarta remains as the seat of Indonesia's legislature to this day.

"Reformasi" Parliament 
With the fall of President Soeharto and his New Order regime, a wave of political and social reform appeared in Indonesia, primarily in the form of four amendments of the 1945 Constitutions. A new chamber of the legislature, Dewan Perwakilan Daerah (Regional Representative Council), was established and occupied the same site as MPR and DPR.

During Widodo Administration, a plan to move the national capital to Kalimantan was announced. The legislatures are planned to be moved there alongside many other central government bodies.

See also

 Inter-Parliamentary Union

References

Notes

Citations

Sources 

 Cribb, Robert (2001) Parlemen Indonesia 1945-1959 (Indonesian Parliaments 1945-1959) in Panduan Parlemen Indonesia (Indonesian Parliamentary Guide), Yayasan API, Jakarta, 
 Daniel Dhaidae & H. Witdarmono (Eds) (2000) Wajah Dewan Perwakilan Rakyat Republik Indonesia Pemilihan Umum 1999 (Faces of the Republic of Indonesia People's Representative Council 1999 General Election) Harian Kompas, Jakarta, 
Denny Indrayana (2008) Indonesian Constitutional Reform 1999-2002: An Evaluation of Constitution-Making in Transition, Kompas Book Publishing, Jakarta 
 Evans, Kevin Raymond, (2003) The History of Political Parties & General Elections in Indonesia, Arise Consultancies, Jakarta, 
 Friend, Theodore (2003) Indonesian Destinies The Belknap Press of Harvard university Press, 
 Hughes, John (2002), The End of Sukarno – A Coup that Misfired: A Purge that Ran Wild, Archipelago Press, 
 Ikrar Nusa Bhakti (2001) Parlemen Dalam Konteks Sejarah 1959-1998 (Parliament in the Historical Context 1959–1998) in Militer dan Parlemen di Indonesia (The Military and Indonesian Parliament in Indonesia) in Panduan Parlelem Indonesia (Indonesian Parliamentary Guide), Yayasan API, Jakarta, 
 Kahin, George McTurnan (1952) Nationalism and Revolution in Indonesia Cornell University Press, 
 
 Poltak Partogi Nainggolan (2001) Parlemen Dalam Konteks Sejarah 1959-1998 (Parliament in the Historical Context 1959–1998) in Panduan Parlelem Indonesia (Indonesian Parliamentary Guide), Yayasan API, Jakarta, 
 Ricklefs (1982), A History of Modern Indonesia, Macmillan Southeast Asian reprint, 
 
 Schwarz, Adam (1994), A Nation in Waiting: Indonesia in the 1990s, Allen & Unwin,

External links
 

People's Representative Council
National lower houses